The Auckland Province was a province of New Zealand from 1853 until the abolition of provincial government in 1876.

Area
The province covered roughly half of the North Island of New Zealand. It was the largest of the six initial provinces, both by area and population. The southern boundary was mostly along the 39th latitude, which was an arbitrary line, as the country's interior was little known by Europeans. It was not subdivided during its existence; the Taranaki Province (originally named New Plymouth Province) was the only other that remained unchanged during its existence.

History
The six original provinces were established in 1853. At that time, about 30,000 Europeans were living in New Zealand, a third of them in the Auckland Province. An estimated 70% of the Māori population was within the Auckland Province. Although the population of Otago Province (triggered by the Central Otago Gold Rush) and then also the Canterbury Province surpassed Auckland's, the northernmost area of the country became most populous again by 1901.

The provincial system was abolished in 1876. Auckland Province was from then used as an administrative district by the Department of Lands and Survey, but the area was later subdivided into the North Auckland, South Auckland, and Gisborne land districts. The 39th latitude was subsequently replaced by boundaries that took landforms into account, and as a consequence, parts of the former Auckland Province are now in the Wellington and Hawke's Bay land districts, and part of the former Wellington Province is in the South Auckland Land District.

Anniversary Day
New Zealand law provides a public holiday for each province's anniversary day. Auckland Anniversary Day generally occurs in late January, on the Monday closest to 29 January, and is still observed throughout the historic province.

Auckland Provincial Council
Auckland Provincial Council was the elected body of Auckland Province. From its second session onwards, the council used the General Assembly House for its meetings. It shared the use of this building with the New Zealand Parliament from 1854 until 1864 during the time that Auckland was the capital of New Zealand. From 1858, the province owned the building, but continued to make it available to parliament.

Superintendents
The Auckland Province had nine Superintendents:

Speakers
The Provincial Council had three Speakers:

Members 
In 1853 the province had 6 electorates, with 24 members:

 City of Auckland, 6 members
 Suburbs of Auckland, 4 members
 Pensioner Settlements, 4 members
 Northern Division, 4 members
 Southern Division, 4 members
 Bay of Islands, 2 members

For its last session of 1873–76, it had 43 members:

 Albertland: John Shepherd
 Auckland East: William John Hurst, Joseph Dargaville, Philip Aaron Philips
 Auckland West: James Thomas Boylan, Patrick Dignan, David Goldie, Frederick Prime, William Swanson
 Bay of Islands: Hugh Carleton
 Coromandel: Alfred Cadman
 Eden: Andrew Beveridge, William Buckland
 Hokianga: John Sheehan
 Kaipara: Henry Lloyd
 Mangonui: William Thomas Ball
 Newton: Rev. Thomas Cheeseman, Thomas Macready
 Onehunga: John Lundon, Maurice O'Rorke
 Opotiki: William Kelly
 Otamatea: Murdoch McLeod
 Pakuranga: Ponsonby John Raleigh Peacocke
 Papakura: William Hay
 Parnell: Benjamin Tonks, Reader Wood
 Raglan: Thomas Wilson
 Ramarama: Joseph Crispe
 Takapuna: George McCullagh Reed
 Tamaki: Robert Nair Ryburn
 Tauranga: George Morris
 Thames: Lemuel Bagnall, John Brown, William Carpenter, William Turnbull Swan, William Davies
 Turanganui: James Woodbine Johnson
 Waikato: William Australia Graham
 Waipa: Henry Byron, Hungerford Roche 
 Wairoa and Mangapai: William Ormiston
 Waitemata: Allan Kerr Taylor
 Waiuku: Ebenezer Hamlin
 Warkworth: William Pollock Moat
 Whangarei: Robert Douglas

Legislation
 Auckland Provincial Ordinances 1854–1875
Public Buildings Act 1875

Footnotes

Notes

References

External links
Map of the old provincial boundaries
Results of 1861 election and Superintendent election
Results of 1862 Superintendent election

Provinces of New Zealand
States and territories established in 1853
1876 disestablishments in New Zealand
History of the Auckland Region
1853 establishments in New Zealand
Former subdivisions of the Auckland Region